The 2021–22 season is Barrow's second consecutive season in League Two. Along with the league, the club will also compete in the FA Cup, the EFL Cup and the EFL Trophy. The season covers the period from 1 July 2021 to 30 June 2022.

During pre-season, Mark Cooper was appointed as the club's new manager on a three-year deal.

Squad statistics

Transfers

Transfers in

Loans in

Loans out

Transfers out

Pre-season friendlies
Barrow confirmed they would play friendly matches against Holker Old Boys, Lancaster City, Spennymoor Town, Birmingham City, Bolton Wanderers and Southport as part of their pre-season schedule.

Competitions

League Two

League table

Results summary

Results by matchday

Matches
Barrow's fixtures were announced on 24 June 2021.

FA Cup

Barrow were drawn away to Banbury United in the first round, Ipswich Town in the second round and Barnsley in the third round.

EFL Cup

Barrow were drawn at home to Scunthorpe United in the first round and Aston Villa in the second round.

EFL Trophy

Barrow were drawn into Northern Group G alongside Accrington Stanley, Leicester City U21s and Fleetwood Town. The group stage matches were confirmed on 29 June.

References

Barrow
Barrow A.F.C. seasons